Henry Martin Johnston (11 November 1908 – 9 January 1977) was an Irish Fianna Fáil politician. A farmer by trade, he was elected to Dáil Éireann as a Fianna Fáil Teachta Dála (TD) for the Meath constituency at the 1959 by-election caused by the death of James Griffin of Fianna Fáil. He lost his seat at the 1961 general election.

References

1908 births
1991 deaths
Fianna Fáil TDs
Members of the 16th Dáil
Politicians from County Meath
Irish farmers